FBReader is an e-book reader for Linux, Microsoft Windows, Android, and other platforms.

It was originally written for the Sharp Zaurus and currently runs on many other mobile devices, like the Nokia Internet Tablets, as well as desktop computers. A preview of FBReaderJ (the Java port) for Google Android was released on April 13, 2008.

Supported formats include EPUB, FictionBook, HTML, plucker, PalmDoc, zTxt, TCR, CHM, RTF, OEB, mobi without DRM, and plain-text.

It was formerly free software under the GPL, but since 2015 (v2.7) is proprietary software.

History 
Nikolay Pultsin wrote the first FBReader; the tool was released for the Sharp Zaurus in January 2005, a Maemo port was added in December 2005 for the Nokia 770. FBReader has since had binary packages released for many mobile-device platforms and for most major personal computer operating systems.
The FBReader name with the FB prefix comes from FictionBook, an e-book format popular in Russia, the country of FBReader's author.

The original FBReader was written in C++; however, in 2007 a fork called FBReaderJ was created, which was written in Java. As the Android platform became available in the following years, this fork became the codebase for the Android software application, while the C++ codebase remained in use for other platforms.

In 2015 the software for all platforms became closed-source: the old open-source code hasn't been updated since.  The Android app was split into Free and Premium versions, both closed-source, with the Premium version adding integrated support for PDF and for machine translation.

Components 
For easy cross-platform compiling, FBReader uses zlibrary, a cross-platform interface library. It allows recompiling for many platforms while disregarding the GUI-toolkit used.

Features
 support Multiple book tar, ZIP, GZIP and BZIP2 archives.
 encoding detection
 generates contents table.
 Embedded images
 hyperlinks
 Position indicator (substitutes for page number).
 library building
 Most Recent Book
 last read positions for all previously opened books
 List of last opened books.
 Automatic hyphenations
 Text search.
 Full-screen mode.
 Screen rotation by 90, 180 and 270 degrees.
 Text-to-speech
To activate text to speech on the Android platform, install a TTS plugin

File format support 
FBReader supports the following file formats:
 EPUB : all the main features except the tables. CSS support is not complete.
 EPUB3 : does not support most of ePub 3 specific features
 Mobipocket : opens non-encrypted *.mobi files. DRM-protected files are not supported.
 FB 2.0 : fully supported
 FB 2.1 : lacks support of tables
 HTML : limited, sufficient support
 Plain text : supported, might not correctly split text into paragraphs.
 RTF : subset of RTF
 DOC (Microsoft Word) : subset of DOC
 PDF :
Android: via separate plugin with third-party library
Other platforms: not supported
 DjVu :
Android: via separate plugin
Other platforms: not supported
 Plucker :
Android: not supported at this moment
Other platforms: “absolute positioning” commands may be interpreted or ignored
DAISY 3 : added to Go Read for Bookshare on Google Play (a fork of FBReaderJ by Benetech)

Multi-Platform Support
Tizen
 Microsoft Windows
 BlackBerry 10
 Mac OS X
 FreeBSD
 Linux
 mobile Linux devices:
 Sharp Zaurus with Qtopia-based ROMs, pdaXrom or OpenZaurus ROM.
 Archos PMA430.
 Siemens Simpad with Opensimpad 0.9.0/Opie ROM.
 Nokia 770/N800/N810 Nokia Internet tablets (maemo).
 Pepper Pad 3.
 Motorola E680i/A780 smartphones.
 iLiad
 Digital Reader 1000 and Digital Reader DR800SG
 Hanlin eReader
 Openinkpot - OS replacement for Hanlin eReader and Hanvon N516
 Pocketbook - E Ink e-book readers
 SmartQ 5 and SmartQ 7

See also

 Comparison of e-book readers
 Comparison of e-book formats
 Comparison of Android e-reader software
 Comparison of iOS e-reader software

References

External links
 

Linux text-related software
Free multimedia software
Free software programmed in C++
Free software programmed in Java (programming language)
EPUB readers
Free and open-source Android software
Open-source software converted to a proprietary license